Mihai Zamfir (born 22 January 1955) is a Romanian former football defender and manager.

International career
Mihai Zamfir played 10 games for Romania, making his debut under coach Ștefan Kovács when he came as a substitute and replaced Florin Cheran in the 24th minute of a 2–0 victory against Bulgaria at the 1977–80 Balkan Cup. He also played in a 1–1 against Bulgaria at the 1977–80 Balkan Cup and made three appearances at the Euro 1980 qualifiers.

Honours
Argeș Pitești
Divizia A: 1978–79
Inter Sibiu
Divizia B: 1987–88

References

External links

1955 births
Living people
Romanian footballers
Romania international footballers
Association football defenders
Liga I players
Liga II players
FC Argeș Pitești players
FC Olt Scornicești players
FC Dacia Pitești players
Romanian football managers
FC Argeș Pitești managers
FC Politehnica Timișoara managers
CSM Unirea Alba Iulia managers
Sportspeople from Pitești